Jerry March, Ph.D. (August 1, 1929 – December 25, 1997) was an American organic chemist and a professor of chemistry at Adelphi University.  

March authored the March's Advanced Organic Chemistry text, which is considered to be a pillar of graduate-level organic chemistry texts.  The book was prepared in its fifth edition at the time of his death.

External links 
 New York Times obituary

Organic chemists
1929 births
1997 deaths
Adelphi University faculty